Georgios Darivas (born 12 March 1926) is a Greek former footballer. He competed in the men's tournament at the 1952 Summer Olympics.

References

External links

1926 births
Living people
Olympiacos F.C. players
Greece international footballers
Olympic footballers of Greece
Footballers at the 1952 Summer Olympics

Footballers from Athens
Greek footballers

Association football forwards
Mediterranean Games gold medalists for Greece
Mediterranean Games medalists in football
Footballers  at the 1951 Mediterranean Games
Olympiacos F.C. managers
Fostiras F.C. managers
Greek football managers